One on One is a 1979 collaboration album by jazz keyboardist Bob James and guitarist Earl Klugh that won the Grammy Award for Best Pop Instrumental Performance in 1981. In 1982 the album was certified gold in the United States.

Track listing

Overview 
The album was recorded at Mediasound, Sound Palace, and SoundMixers Studios in New York City in 1979. Tape mastering took place at CBS Recording Studio in New York. The album was released in late 1979 by Tappan Zee, the label owned by Bob James, promoted and distributed by Columbia in the US and CBS in the UK.

"Jazz Jam" was a throwaway track assembled by James for the engineers to balance their recording levels. "Jazz Jam" remained unreleased until Bob James found it while re-releasing the album for the Japanese market. "Jazz Jam" was remastered for the 30th anniversary release of the album in 2009 in the US and Europe including the UK. The interview contained as a bonus track on the 30th anniversary edition of the album was recorded in 2009.

Personnel 
 Bob James – acoustic piano, Fender Rhodes, arrangements, conductor 
 Earl Klugh – acoustic guitar
 Eric Gale – guitar (2, 3, 5)
 Neil Jason – bass guitar (1, 2)
 Gary King – bass guitar (3, 5)
 Ron Carter – acoustic bass (4, 6)
 Harvey Mason – drums
 Ralph MacDonald – percussion

Orchestra
 David Nadien – concertmaster
 James Buffington – French horn
 Phil Bodner – woodwinds
 Wally Kane – woodwinds
 George Marge –  woodwinds
 Romeo Penque –  woodwinds
 Alan Shulman – cello
 Charles McCracken – cello
 Al Brown – viola
 Emanuel Vardi – viola 
 Harry Cykman – violin
 Lewis Eley – violin
 Max Ellen – violin
 Barry Finclair – violin
 Marvin Morgenstern – violin
 Matthew Raimondi – violin
 Richard Sortomme – violin

Production 
 Bob James – producer 
 Joe Jorgensen – recording, mixing 
 Tim Benedict – assistant engineer
 Gregory Mann – assistant engineer
 Michel Savage – assistant engineer
 Stan Kalina – mastering 
 Marion Orr – production coordinator 
 Paula Scher – cover design 
 Arnold Rosenberg – cover photography 
 David Gahr – inside photography

Charts

References

External links 
 Bob James & Earl Klugh-One On One at Discogs

1979 albums
Earl Klugh albums
Bob James (musician) albums
Albums produced by Bob James (musician)
Columbia Records albums